Frankfort is a city in Clinton County, Indiana, United States. The population was 16,422 at the 2010 census. The city is the county seat of Clinton County.

History
Brothers John, William and Nicholas Pence, previously of Warren County, Ohio, settled on the land on which Frankfort now stands in 1829, having entered it from the government in 1827 and 1828.  In 1830, the brothers donated  of the land to the county commissioners, a donation which led to the establishment of the county seat at that site rather than in Jefferson, a community which had also been vying for the honor.  The new town was named Frankfort at the brothers' request and honors their German great-grandparents' home of Frankfurt am Main.

The town of Frankfort was laid off on the  tract by William Douglass, the county agent, and the plat filed on June 8, 1830. The original plat consisted of 64 lots in eight blocks surrounding a public square where the courthouse now stands. The county board paid contractors Allen & Michael the sum of $20 to erect the first courthouse, a -story temporary structure made of logs hewn from trees that grew on the square and surrounding streets. Its replacement was built by contractor John Elder in 1837 and 1838 for $12,000 and operated for 45 years. Its cornerstone was laid September 2, 1882.

The youngest elected mayor of Frankfort was Robert Keene at the age of 21 when he took office in January 1922 just one month prior to the fire at Old Stoney on February 24, 1922. At the time of the fire, Old Stoney was used as the high school. Today, Old Stoney is used as City Hall.

In addition to Old Stoney, the Christian Ridge Historic District, Clinton County Courthouse, Charles H. and Emma Condon House, Frankfort Commercial Historic District, and South Frankfort Historic District are listed on the National Register of Historic Places.

Geography

Demographics

2010 census
As of the census of 2010, there were 16,422 people, 5,835 households, and 3,972 families living in the city. The racial makeup of the city was 71.9% White, 0.6% African American, 0.3% Native American, 0.2% Asian, 13.1% from other races, and 1.8% from two or more races. Hispanic or Latino of any race were 27.0% of the population.

There were 5,835 households, of which 38.2% had children under the age of 18 living with them, 47.0% were married couples living together, 14.9% had a female householder with no husband present, 6.2% had a male householder with no wife present, and 31.9% were non-families. 26.5% of all households were made up of individuals, and 11.2% had someone living alone who was 65 years of age or older. The average household size was 2.71 and the average family size was 3.26.

The median age in the city was 33.5 years. 28.2% of residents were under the age of 18; 9.9% were between the ages of 18 and 24; 25.4% were from 25 to 44; 22.8% were from 45 to 64; and 13.8% were 65 years of age or older. The gender makeup of the city was 49.3% male and 50.7% female.

2000 census
As of the census of 2000, there were 16,662 people, 6,279 households, and 4,175 families living in the city. The racial makeup of the city was 70.08% White, 0.47% African American, 0.16% Native American, 0.28% Asian, 0.03% Pacific Islander, 7.84% from other races, and 1.14% from two or more races. Hispanic or Latino of any race were 20.53% of the population.

There were 6,279 households, out of which 33.0% had children under the age of 18 living with them, 49.5% were married couples living together, 11.8% had a female householder with no husband present, and 33.5% were non-families. 28.7% of all households were made up of individuals, and 13.6% had someone living alone who was 65 years of age or older. 
In the city, the population was spread out, with 27.0% under the age of 18, 10.9% from 18 to 24, 27.3% from 25 to 44, 19.1% from 45 to 64, and. 15.7% who were 65 years of age or older. The median age was 34 years. For every 100 females, there were 95.0 males. For every 100 females age 18 and over, there were 90.0 males.

The median income for a household in the city was $33,275, and the median income for a family was $42,686. Males had a median income of $32,092 versus $23,722 for females. The per capita income for the city was $15,393. About 8.8% of families and 11.7% of the population were below the poverty line, including 12.1% of those under age 18 and 10.9% of those age 65 or over.

Transportation

Airport
Frankfort is served by the Frankfort Municipal Airport.

Highways
U.S. 421 and Indiana state routes 28, 39 and 75 converge in the city. Interstate 65 is a short distance to the west of Frankfort.

Rail
The city is at the junction of several rail lines. The Monon Railroad (The Hoosier and the Tippecanoe Chicago-Indianapolis trains), New York, Chicago and St. Louis Railroad (Nickel Plate) (The Blue Arrow and the Blue Dart St. Louis-Cleveland trains) and the Pennsylvania Railroad (The Kentuckian [Chicago-Indianapolis] and South Wind [Chicago-Miami/Tampa/St. Petersburg] trains) ran passenger trains through the city. Successor railroads such as CSX and Norfolk Southern have the tracks or right of ways of the routes today.

Notable people
 Charles Aidman, film and television actor.  He appeared several times on The Twilight Zone and The Wild Wild West and in such films as Pork Chop Hill.
 Anthony Caruso, film and television actor. He appeared several times on Perry Mason and also on Star Trek and in such films as The Asphalt Jungle.
 Everett Case, who made Frankfort his home for more than 20 years and coached the men's high school basketball team to state championships in 1925, 1929, 1936, and 1939
 Kyle Cook from the bands Matchbox Twenty and The New Left
 Reuben W. Coon, Illinois state legislator, newspaper editor, and lawyer
 Jim Davis, legislator
 Will Geer, film and stage actor, best known as Grandpa Zeb on The Waltons and for movies such as Winchester '73 and Bandolero!
 Rana Foroohar, financial reporter for Time
 Mahlon D. Manson, Union Army brigadier general (died in Frankfort while returning home via train from Monticello to Crawfordsville)
 Linley E. Pearson, 37th Indiana Attorney General
 John Stonebraker, NFL player
 James P. Ulm, U.S. Air Force brigadier general
 Talitha Washington, mathematician and STEM education activist at Howard University

Education
Public
 Community Schools of Frankfort

In the fall of 2013 Ivy Tech opened a campus in Frankfort on a site that once housed The Frankfort Times, the local newspaper.

The city has a free lending library, the Frankfort Community Public Library.

References

External links

City of Frankfort, Indiana website

Cities in Indiana
Populated places established in 1830
Cities in Clinton County, Indiana
Micropolitan areas of Indiana
County seats in Indiana
1830 establishments in Indiana